Timothy Jerome Denton, Sr. (born February 2, 1973) is a former American football defensive back in the National Football League for the Washington Redskins and the San Diego Chargers.

Denton was born in Galveston, Texas. He played college football at Sam Houston State University and the University of Oklahoma. On March 24, 2002, Denton was signed by the Dallas Desperados.

1973 births
Living people
Sportspeople from Galveston, Texas
American football cornerbacks
Blinn Buccaneers football players
Sam Houston Bearkats football players
Oklahoma Sooners football players
Washington Redskins players
San Diego Chargers players
Dallas Desperados players